Lionell Singleton (born November 13, 1985) is a former professional indoor football defensive back for the Alabama Vipers and the Tri-Cities Fever. He was signed by the Alabama Vipers as an undrafted free agent in 2010. He played college football at Florida International. Singleton was released by the Fever on March 24, 2015, and announced his retirement following the release. He was inducted into the Indoor Football League Hall of Fame in 2016.

References

External links
FIU Panthers bio

1985 births
Living people
American football defensive backs
FIU Panthers football players
Alabama Vipers players
Tri-Cities Fever players
Players of American football from Tallahassee, Florida